Rapperswil is a town in the municipality of Rapperswil-Jona, Switzerland.

Rapperswil may refer to:

 Rapperswil-Jona, a municipality in the Wahlkreis of See-Gaster in the canton of St. Gallen in Switzerland
 Rapperswil Castle, a castle in Rapperswil
 Paddle steamer Stadt Rapperswil, a paddle steamship of the Zürichsee-Schifffahrtsgesellschaft (ZSG) named after the town of Rapperswil
 House of Rapperswil, the noble medieval Swiss family of that name
 Elisabeth von Rapperswil (around 1251 or 1261 – † 1309 probably in Rapperswil), last Countess of the House of Rapperswil
 Johann I von Laufenburg-Rapperswil, son of Elisabeth von Rapperswil
 Johann II von Laufenburg-Rapperswil, son of Johann I
 Rapperswil, Berne, a municipality in Aarberg District in the canton of Bern in Switzerland

See also
Rapperswill, Edmonton, neighbourhood in Edmonton, Canada
Rupperswil, canton of Aargau, Switzerland